The Dubai Japanese School (DJS) or  is a Japanese curriculum school located in the Al Wasl area in Dubai. The Northern Association of Japanese Community established the school in 1980. The school is in proximity of Jumeira Beach. The pink-colored building is adjacent to the Modern High School campus.

Fumiyoshi Suzuki, the principal, stated in 2009 that almost all graduates of his school go back to Japan to go to high school.

References

Further reading
 田尻 悟郎 and 猪股 俊哉. "ゆかいな仲間たちの「授業見学」(7)海外日本人学校での英語授業: UAEドバイ日本人学校の場合." The English Teachers' Magazine (英語教育  ) 52(7), 40-42, 2003-10. 大修館書店. See profile at CiNii.
 藤田 雅也 (坂出市立白峰中学校・ドバイ日本人学校). "UAEの海を豊かに,日本の国際貢献 : 平成14年ドバイ日本人学校第一回現地理解セミナー : 「UAE水産資源開発センター玉栄茂康氏の講演より」(第4章国際理解教育・現地理解教育)." 在外教育施設における指導実践記録 28, 95-98, 2005. Tokyo Gakugei University. See profile at CiNii.

External links

 Dubai Japanese School 
 English information
  (Archive)

International schools in Dubai
Educational institutions established in 1980
Japanese international schools in the United Arab Emirates
Dubai